Nain is a settlement in Jamaica. It has a population of 2,331 as of 2009. The Alpart Sports Club Ground, which has played host to first-class cricket matches for Jamaica is located in the village.

References

Populated places in Saint Elizabeth Parish